General Sir Peter Anthony Wall,  (born 10 July 1955) is a retired British Army officer who served as the Chief of the General Staff, the professional head of the British Army, until September 2014. Wall had previously been the Commander-in-Chief, Land Forces from August 2009 to September 2010. He succeeded General Sir David Richards as Chief of the General Staff in September 2010, the latter going on a month later to be Chief of the Defence Staff.

Early life and education
Born in Ipswich, Suffolk, the son of Dorothy Margaret and John Ramsay Wall, Wall was educated at Whitgift School and Selwyn College, Cambridge.

Military career

Wall graduated from the Royal Military Academy Sandhurst and was commissioned into the Royal Engineers in April 1974 with his commission being confirmed in December 1974, with effect from 9 March the same year. After a short period of military duties, Wall studied engineering at University of Cambridge, before joining airborne forces and going on to serve with the Royal Engineers in Belize and Rhodesia. Wall was promoted to captain on 9 September 1980 and to major on 30 September 1987.

He was appointed Chief of Staff of the 5th Airborne Brigade in 1988, before commanding 9 Parachute Squadron, Royal Engineers from 1990. Promoted to lieutenant colonel on 30 June 1992, he was appointed Commanding Officer of 32 Engineer Regiment in Germany in 1994, and appointed an Officer of the Order of the British Empire in the 1994 Birthday Honours. He was deployed to the Former Republic of Yugoslavia in Spring 1996, promoted to colonel on 30 June and awarded the Queen's Commendation for Valuable Service in November. He was then promoted to brigadier on 31 December 1998 with seniority from 30 June 1998, before assuming command of 24 Airmobile Brigade in 1999. Wall was responsible for converting the formation into 16 Air Assault Brigade later that year.

High command
In 2001, Wall became Chief of Joint Force Operations at Permanent Joint Headquarters Northwood, and was appointed a Commander of the Order of the British Empire in the 2002 New Year Honours. Wall went on to serve as Chief of Staff of the National Contingent HQ in Qatar, overseeing UK operations in Iraq, from January 2003. In May 2003, Wall assumed the appointment of General Officer Commanding 1st (UK) Armoured Division with the substantive rank of major general, in which capacity he was responsible for security in Basra in Iraq. In 2005, he became Deputy Chief of Joint Operations at the Permanent Joint Headquarters Northwood and, on 1 August 2007, he was appointed Deputy Chief of the Defence Staff (Commitments) and promoted to lieutenant general. Appointed a Knight Commander of the Order of the Bath in the 2009 Birthday Honours, Wall succeeded General Sir Kevin O'Donoghue as Chief Royal Engineer on 10 May 2009 before taking up the post of Commander-in-Chief, Land Forces and receiving promotion to the substantive rank of general on 17 July 2009. He was also appointed the aide-de-camp general to Queen Elizabeth II on 30 October 2009.

On 6 January 2010, Wall gave evidence to the Iraq Inquiry in which he claimed that troops were vulnerable in their base at Basra Palace and in May 2010, Wall was listed amongst the top 172 government servants that earn more than the Prime Minister, with a salary of £160–165,000, excluding his non-contributory final salary pension. Then on 29 July 2010, Wall was named as the next Chief of the General Staff, the professional head of the British Army. On 15 September 2010 Wall took over the post from General Sir David Richards who became Chief of the Defence Staff in late October 2010.

On 24 June 2011, it was reported that Wall, who had publicly questioned Prime Minister David Cameron's handling of the conflict in Afghanistan, would – in a major defence reorganisation that would also affect the other service chiefs – lose his position on the Defence Board, the highest non-ministerial Ministry of Defence committee, which makes decision on all aspects of military policy. The changes took effect on 1 November 2011.

Amidst ministerial, media and political pressure from both sides of the House, Wall told an army magazine in April 2014 that lifting the ban on women serving in combat units was "something we need to be considering seriously". It came to light that, under European law, the policy of preventing female soldiers from applying for certain jobs in the army was to be reviewed by 2018, and that the US, Australia, Canada, France, Germany, Holland, Denmark, Norway and Israel all allowed women to serve in combat units. The Times had reported that his main motivation for changing this rule was showing potential female recruits that the army was an equal opportunities employer:

Wall was appointed Colonel Commandant of the Royal Electrical and Mechanical Engineers in 2002, and Colonel Commandant of the Corps of Royal Engineers in November 2003. He was appointed a Knight Grand Cross of the Order of the Bath in the 2013 Birthday Honours. From April 2012 until August 2016 Wall served as the Colonel Commandant of the Brigade of Gurkhas.

Since leaving the army, Wall co-founded and is Chief Executive of a leadership and change consultancy, Amicus Limited.

Personal life
In 1980 Wall married Fiona Anne Simpson; they have two sons. He lists his interests as sports. He was appointed as a Deputy Lieutenant for the County of Somerset on 2 February 2015. This gave him the Post Nominal Letters "DL" for Life.

References

External links
Operation Telic Biography
MoD announce New head of the British Army takes up post

|-

|-

|-

|-

1955 births
Alumni of Selwyn College, Cambridge
British Army generals
British Army personnel of the Iraq War
British military leaders of the Iraq War
Chiefs of the General Staff (United Kingdom)
Commanders of the Order of the British Empire
Deputy Lieutenants of Somerset
Graduates of the Royal Military Academy Sandhurst
Knights Grand Cross of the Order of the Bath
Living people
People educated at Whitgift School
Recipients of the Commendation for Valuable Service
Royal Engineers officers
Military personnel from Ipswich